Second Heaven is a 1982 novel by Judith Guest. 

It may also refer to:
Second Heaven in the Seven Heavens
Second Heaven (album) (第二天堂; Di Er Tian Tang), a 2004 album by Taiwanese singer JJ Lin